The Boeing XP-8 (Boeing Model 66) was a prototype American biplane fighter of the 1920s, notable for its unusual design incorporating the engine radiator into the lower wing.

Design and development
Boeing developed the prototype in 1926 as a private venture, with the goal of winning the Army Air Corps competition announced in 1925. Designated by Boeing as its Model 66, the airframe was basically a PW-9 with an experimental 600 hp Packard 2A-1500 engine. In order to streamline around the engine, the radiator was moved back so that the opening coincided with the front edge of the lower wing, resulting in an unusually narrow profile around the engine.

Testing
Army testing of the aircraft began in January 1928, and it handled well, but performance was lacking, achieving only a maximum speed of 173.2 mph. Even so, the prototype continued in Air Corps service until June 1929, after which it was scrapped. The airframe design lived on in the Navy's Boeing F2B.

Operators

United States Army Air Corps

Specifications (XP-8)

See also

References

Notes

Bibliography

 Boeing Company. Pedigree of Champions: Boeing Since 1916, Third Edition. Seattle, Washington: The Boeing Company, 1969.
 Dorr, Robert F. and Donald, David. Fighters of the United States Air Force. London: Temple, 1990. .
 Jones, Lloyd S. U.S. Fighters: Army-Air Force 1925 to 1980s. Fallbrook, California: Aero Publishers, Inc., 1975. .

External links

 Boeing XP-8

Boeing P-08
P-08
Single-engined tractor aircraft
Biplanes
Aircraft first flown in 1928